The Irish Defence Forces established a Coast Watching Service in the run up to World War II, known in the Republic of Ireland as The Emergency, while the State remained neutral. Between 1939 and 1942 the construction of 83 Lookout Posts, LOPs, took place at strategic points (every 5–15 miles) along the Irish coastline and the local volunteers (Coastwatchers) serving at these posts were responsible for monitoring the Irish coastline for belligerent activity at sea. The LOPS were designed by Howard Cooke RIBA of the Irish Office of Public Works in 1939.

After the hostilities ended most of these buildings were abandoned and some were removed. Traces of a significant number remain in place and some are in relatively good repair. In general, structures in more isolated locations have tended to remain in place.

Coast watchers
Coast watchers worked around the clock in pairs on eight- or twelve-hour shifts. One man operated the telephone inside the LOP, the other patrolled outside. They had to report every activity observed at sea or in the air in the vicinity of their LOP. Each LOP was assigned a unique identifying number starting with "LOP 1" in County Louth and continuing in a clockwise direction around the coast finishing with "LOP 82" at Inishowen in County Donegal.

LOP 83 is located between LOP 35 and LOP 36 in County Kerry

Log books
Each LOP had to keep a record of any activity at sea or in the air, and a number of logbooks have survived and are held by the Irish Military Archives. The number of surviving logbooks for each post and a sample ledger is available in the table below.

EIRE markings

Following the construction of the network of lookout posts along the coast of Ireland, it was decided to add large signs marking the coast as EIRE. According to Michael Kennedy's book on the coastwatching service, Guarding Neutral Ireland,  it was "a way to reduce the number of aircraft landing because their crews had lost their bearings". Kennedy's research indicates that these signs were constructed at the behest of the American authorities.

A number of signs such as the one at Cahore Point, Co.Wexford were built too small initially and so larger signs were built over them at a later stage. A number of the signs still exist in varying states of repair, mostly along the west of the country and in addition some of have been renovated such as the one in Loop Head, County Clare.

Table of Lookout Posts

See also
 Donegal Corridor
 Irish Neutrality WW2

References

External links
Lookout Post Project
EIRE Signs of WWII
Military Archive
Buildings of Ireland

Military of the Republic of Ireland
Independent Ireland in World War II
1939 in Ireland
1940s in Ireland